Dhirkot is a Tehsil in Bagh District, Azad Kashmir, Pakistan.

Villages within Dhirkot include Chamankot. It is known for its deodar jungle.

References

Tehsils of Bagh District
Populated places in Bagh District